Alice Jeanette Herz (née Strauß, alternatively rendered Strauss; May 25, 1882 – March 26, 1965) was a German feminist, anti-fascist and peace activist. She was the first person in the United States known to have immolated herself in protest of the escalating Vietnam War, following the example of Buddhist monk Thích Quảng Đức who immolated himself in protest of the oppression of Buddhists under the South Vietnamese government of Catholic President Ngo Dinh Diem.

Early life
Alice Jeanette Strauß was the first child of Rosalie Kramer (1858–1943) and Moritz Strauß (1850–1920), both of German-Jewish descent. She had six siblings, five younger sisters and a younger brother, who died at the age of two. She finished intermediate education and studied to become a teacher, but an eye disorder prevented Herz from completing her seminars and she instead found work as a secretary for a lawyer's office. In 1907, Herz converted from Judaism to Protestantism.

Activism in Germany 
During the early 1900's, Herz joined the feminist movement and became an advocate for women's rights, particularly for universal suffrage and cohabitation. She married Paul Herz, a chemist and the brother of Helene Herz, a prominent suffragette. The couple moved to Güstrow in Mecklenburg-Vorpommern and had two children, Helga (1912–2010) and Konrad (1915–1929). Konrad was born physically weak and was nearly blind.

Shortly after the beginning of World War I, her husband was drafted into the military, with Herz expecting German victory and Paul's return within months. In 1918, with no end of the war in sight, Herz began openly supporting the democratisation of Germany with fellow pro-democracy activists and feminists, who sought the implementation of the vote for women. The movement tried to appeal to state minister Hans Sivkovich for "the right to vote by universal, equal, secret and direct suffrage" and with the end of World War I in November that same year, voting rights were realised with the founding of the Weimar Republic. In 1919, the Herz family moved to Berlin-Mahlsdorf, where Paul secured a position at a rubber factory. Possibly as a result of the regular exposure to harzardous chemicals, Paul died of kidney failure on December 30, 1928, aged 45. Their son Konrad passed away only weeks later from health complications.

On March 13, 1933, Herz and her daughter Helga left Germany for Switzerland, something she had considered for the past few years due to concerns with rising anti-semitism and the growing political power of right-wing parties in the Weimar Republic. She soldified her decision with the appointment of Adolf Hitler as Reich Chancellor. Herz had correctly predicted that ethnic Jews and political opponents would come under heavy scrutiny, particularly after the Reichstag fire. Alice and Helga then moved to France, where Alice learned French and Esperanto. Both Herz women continued to engage in political activism through their involvement in the Women's International League for Peace and Freedom, with Alice criticising Nazism in papers she supplied to publications of the Social Democratic Party of Germany. Upon its forceful dissolution by the Nazi government in the summer of 1933, she became a writer for the Swiss Christian Socialist magazine Neue Wege.

Following the Invasion of France, Herz and her daughter spend time at Gurs internment camp near the Spanish border, Alice and Helga eventually came to the United States in 1942.

Life in the United States and anti-war effort 
They settled in Detroit, Michigan, where Helga became a librarian at the Detroit Public Library, and Alice worked for some time as an adjunct instructor of German at Wayne State University. The pair petitioned for, but were denied, U.S. citizenship due to their refusal to vow to defend the nation by arms. Helga later reapplied and was granted citizenship in 1954, but it is not clear if Alice ever did so. Alice and Helga joined the Unitarians, and both became involved in the activities of several peace groups.

Herz wrote an open letter, which she distributed to several friends and fellow activists before her death. In her letter, she accused President Lyndon B. Johnson of using his military power "to wipe out whole countries of his choosing". She appealed to the American people to “awake and take action” against war, and explained her self-immolation as an attempt "to make myself heard".

Self-immolation
Herz set fire to herself on a street in Detroit on March 16, 1965, at the age of 82. A motorist and his two sons were driving by and saw her burning and put out the flames. She died of her injuries ten days later. According to Taylor Branch's At Canaan's Edge (2006), it was President Johnson's address to Congress in support of a Voting Rights Act that led her to believe the moment was propitious to protest the Vietnam War. The war continued for another ten years following her death.

Legacy 
Confiding to a friend before her death, Herz remarked that she had used all of the accepted protest methods available to activists—including marching, protesting, and writing countless articles and letters—and she wondered what else she could do. Japanese author and philosopher Shingo Shibata established the Alice Herz Peace Fund shortly after her death. A square in Berlin (Alice-Herz-Platz [de])was named in her honor in 2003.

See also
List of political self-immolations

References

Further reading
 Coburn, Jon (2015). Making a difference: The History and Memory of Women Strike for Peace, 1961-1990. PhD Thesis, Northumbria University. pp. 117–128
 Coburn, Jon (2018). "I Have Chosen the Flaming Death”: The Forgotten Self‐Immolation of Alice Herz, Peace and Change 43 (1), 32-60
 Seiler, Mark (2001). Alice Herz, in Feilchenfeldt, Konrad; Hawrylchak, Sandra H. (eds.): Deutschsprachige Exilliteratur seit 1933: USA (Studien zur deutschen Exilliteratur, 3, part 2), Bern/München, pp. 140–159
 Shingo Shibata: Phoenix: Letters and Documents of Alice Herz. New York: Bruce Publishing 1969

External links
 
 Speaking Out Against the Vietnam War

1882 births
1965 deaths
1965 suicides
American anti–Vietnam War activists
Self-immolations in protest of the Vietnam War
German feminists
German anti-fascists
Jewish activists
German pacifists
Jewish emigrants from Nazi Germany to the United States
Wayne State University faculty
Suicides in Michigan
Deaths from fire in the United States
Converts to Quakerism
American Quakers
German Quakers
American pacifists
20th-century Quakers
Gurs internment camp survivors
American women academics
20th-century American women